Al-Basra Sport Club is an Iraqi football team based in Al-Jamhoriya, Basra, that plays in Iraq Division Two.

History

in Premier League
The Al-Basra team played in the Iraqi Premier League for the first time in the 2002–03 season, and they weren’t good enough, and it was at the bottom of the standings, but there was no relegation in the league. So they returned in the next season with the same level and bottom of the standings, and there was no relegation either, where the league stopped due to the war and in their third season In the Premier League, the 2004–05 season was a bad season for the team as well, and in the end, the team was eliminated from the Group Stage and relegated to the Iraq Division One.

Current squad

First-team squad

Current technical staff

{| class="toccolours"
!bgcolor=silver|Position
!bgcolor=silver|Name
!bgcolor=silver|Nationality
|- bgcolor=#eeeeee
|Manager:||Bassam Khairallah||
|- 
|Assistant manager:||Hussein Naseer||
|-bgcolor=#eeeeee
| Assistant manager:||Fahad Abdullah||
|- 
|Goalkeeping coach:||Ghassan Abdul Karim||
|- bgcolor=#eeeeee
| Fitness coach:||Ali Mohammed||
|-

References

External links
 Al-Basra SC on Goalzz.com
 Iraq Clubs- Foundation Dates
 Al-Basra Clubs Union

Football clubs in Iraq
1992 establishments in Iraq
Association football clubs established in 1992
Football clubs in Basra
Basra